Hale Township is one of the fifteen townships of Hardin County, Ohio, United States. As of the 2010 census the population was 1,590, of whom 737 lived in the unincorporated portion of the township.

Geography
Located in the southeastern corner of the county, it borders the following townships:
Dudley Township - north
Bowling Green Township, Marion County - east
Washington Township, Union County - southeast
Bokescreek Township, Logan County - southwest
Taylor Creek Township - west
Buck Township - northwest

Two villages are located in Hale Township: Mount Victory in the center, and part of Ridgeway in the southeast along the border with Bokescreek Township.

Name and history
Hale Township was established in 1835. It is the only Hale Township statewide.

Government
The township is governed by a three-member board of trustees, who are elected in November of odd-numbered years to a four-year term beginning on the following January 1. Two are elected in the year after the presidential election and one is elected in the year before it. There is also an elected township fiscal officer, who serves a four-year term beginning on April 1 of the year after the election, which is held in November of the year before the presidential election. Vacancies in the fiscal officership or on the board of trustees are filled by the remaining trustees.

References

External links
County Website
Hardin County Chamber & Business Alliance website

Townships in Hardin County, Ohio
1835 establishments in Ohio
Populated places established in 1835
Townships in Ohio